"Life-giver"; a Tungus god of souls. Mayin was responsible for giving souls to newborn babies. When this does not happen the baby is soulless. The Tungus believe that those who live a good life would be housed in a heaven ruled by Mayin.

"Mayin" meaning one who has the art & skill of enchantment is a Sanskrit word representing Hindu Gods 'Brahma' & 'Shiv'. 'Mayin' means - the Creator of the Universe.

Tungusic mythology